Princess Eulalia can refer to:
 Infanta Eulalia of Spain (1864-1958)
 Princess Eulalia of Thurn and Taxis (1908-1993)